The Shire of Cobram was a local government area on the Murray River in the Goulburn Valley region, about  north of Melbourne, the state capital of Victoria, Australia.

History

The Shire of Cobram's origins lay in the North West Riding of the Shire of Tungamah, which was first incorporated on 15 May 1878. Cobram's development arose from irrigation projects developed in the 1930s; after World War II, returned servicemen were allocated irrigated holdings for fruit orchards and dairy farms, and Italian immigrants also took up land in the area. A town plan was drafted in 1949, and industrial and commercial growth increased. On 1 April 1953, Cobram was severed from Tungamah, and became a shire in its own right.

On 18 November 1994, the Shire of Cobram was abolished, and along with the Shires of Nathalia, Numurkah, Tungamah and Yarrawonga, was merged into the newly created Shire of Moira.

Wards

The Shire of Cobram was divided into four ridings, each of which elected three councillors:
 North Riding
 South Riding
 East Riding
 West Riding

Towns and localities
 Cobram*
 Katamatite
 Koonoomoo
 Muckatah
 Yarroweyah

* Council seat.

Population

* Estimate in the 1958 Victorian Year Book.

External links
 Victorian Places - Cobram and Cobram Shire

References

Cobram